Fiebre de Luna is the twentieth (20th) studio album by Puerto Rican singer Yolandita Monge. It was released in 1994 and includes the radio hits "A Pesar Del Tiempo", "Como Puedes", and "Dime Cuando".

This album marked a change of image for the singer and a mature sound that included a bachata track, "Me Sorprendió La Luna".  It marked the return to the heavy melodramatic lyrics of past albums, but with modern arrangements, leaving behind the early 1990s style of production from Pablo Manavello and Ricardo Montaner.  This was the second time that Yolandita Monge recorded songs from Las Diego, after the track Contigo from Laberinto de Amor in 1987. The album's cover picture by late photographer and stylist Raúl Torres was the last one done for the singer.

This release earned Gold status and is available as a digital download at iTunes and Amazon.

Track listing

Credits and personnel

Vocals: Yolandita Monge
Producers: Las Diego, Rudy Pérez, Steve Roitstein
Executive Producer: Carlos 'Topy' Mamery
Choral Arrangements on 'El' and 'Fiebre': Rudy Pérez
Choral Arrangements on 'A Pesar Del Tiempo', 'Tu", 'Te Extraño' and 'Me Sorprendió La Luna': Las Diego
Chorus: Geannie Cruz, Wendy Petersen, George Noriega, Rita Quintero, Angie Chirino, Marcos Hernández
Guitars: René Luis Toledo, Manuel López
Sax: Ed Calle
Harmonica & Trombone: Steve Roitstein
Violins: Jorge Orbón, Bodgan Chrvszcz, Jerry Miller, Gustavo Correa, Eddy Martínez, José Montoto, Alfredo Molina, Bob Basso, Phillip Tempkins, Arthur Grossman
Cellos: Barbara Corcillo, Phil Lakofsky, Dan Petrescy, Steve Gigurdson
Violas: David Chappel, Tim Barnes

Sound Engineers: Ron Taylor, Will Tartak, Mike Couzzi, Ted Stein, John Haag, Rudy Pérez, Eric taveras
Assistants: Andrew Roshberg, José martínez, Chris Carol, Greg Schwabe, Rick Raymond
Recorded: Criteria Studios, Miami, Midland Studios, Miami, International Sounds, Miami, Midlab, Santo Domingo
Wardrobe: Roy Longsworth, Oui Boutique, El Imperio Salón, Valentina
Hair & Make-up: Raúl Torres
Stylist: Patricia De La Torre
Model: Juan Carlos Rosario
Art & Design: Juan Carlos Medina
Art Consultant: Stephen Lumel
Art Supervisor: Magda Mena 
Photography and Art Concept: Raúl Torres

Notes

Track listing and credits from album booklet.
Released in Cassette Format on 1994 (95168-4).
Released digitally by WEA-Latina on January 18, 2011.

Charts

Singles Charts

References

Yolandita Monge albums
1990 albums